Dan Cody is also the name of a character in the novel The Great Gatsby.

Daniel Price Cody (born December 1, 1981) is a former American football linebacker. He was drafted by the Baltimore Ravens in the second round of the 2005 NFL Draft. He played college football at Oklahoma.

Early years
Cody won the MVP in high school his freshman, sophomore, junior and senior year, although he attend two different high schools: Coalgate High School in Coalgate, Oklahoma freshman/sophomore years and Ada High School in Ada junior/senior years.

College career
Cody played his college football at Oklahoma, eventually playing in 42 games and making 117 tackles and 25 sacks. He was a Sociology major.

Professional career

Baltimore Ravens
Cody was selected by the Baltimore Ravens in the second round (53rd overall) in the 2005 NFL Draft. His rookie season was ended on the first day of training camp with a knee injury.

On November 19, 2006 Cody played in his first NFL game.

Cody started the 2007 season on the Physically Unable to Perform list due to knee injuries and remained on the list the rest of the season.

Cody was released by the Ravens on August 27, 2008 after defensive end Marques Douglas was acquired from the Tampa Bay Buccaneers.

External links
Baltimore Ravens bio

1981 births
Living people
Players of American football from Oklahoma
American football defensive ends
American football linebackers
Oklahoma Sooners football players
Baltimore Ravens players
People from Coalgate, Oklahoma
Sportspeople from Ada, Oklahoma